
Year 1548 (MDXLVIII) was a leap year starting on Sunday (link will display the full calendar) of the Julian calendar.

Events 
 January–June 
 February 14 – Battle of Uedahara: Firearms are used for the first time on the battlefield in Japan, and Takeda Shingen is defeated by Murakami Yoshikiyo.
 April 1 – Sigismund II Augustus succeeds his father, Sigismund I the Old, as King of Poland and Grand Duke of Lithuania.
 May 11 – The great fire in Brielle begins.
 June
 Ming Chinese naval forces commanded by Zhu Wan destroy the pirate haven of Shuangyu, frequented by Chinese, Japanese and Portuguese smugglers.
 John Dee starts to study at the Old University of Leuven.

 July–December 
 July 7 – A marriage treaty is signed between Scotland and France, whereby five-year-old Mary, Queen of Scots, is betrothed to the future King Francis II of France.
 August 7 – Mary, Queen of Scots, leaves for France.
 October 20 – The city of La Paz, Bolivia, is founded.
 October 31 – At the first sejm of King Sigismund II Augustus of Poland, deputies demand that the king renounce his wife Barbara Radziwiłł.
 December – Siam attacks Tavoy, beginning the Burmese–Siamese War of 1548.

Births 

 January 5 – Francisco Suárez, Spanish priest, philosopher, theologian and saint (d. 1617)
 February 6 – Francesco Panigarola, Italian bishop (d. 1594)
 March 13 – Sasbout Vosmeer, Dutch Apostolic Vicar (d. 1614)
 March 17 – Honda Tadakatsu, Japanese general (d. 1610)
 March 18 – Cornelis Ketel, Dutch painter (d. 1616)
 April 15 – Pietro Cataldi, Italian mathematician (d. 1626)
 May – Carel van Mander, Dutch painter and poet (d. 1606)
 May 8 – Giacomo Boncompagni, illegitimate son of a Pope (d. 1612)
 May 10 – Antonio Priuli, Doge of Venice (d. 1623)
 July 8 – Kim Jang-saeng, Korean scholar and writer (d. 1631)
 July 15 – George III, Count of Erbach-Breuberg (1564–1605) (d. 1605)
 August 26 – Bernardino Poccetti, Italian painter (d. 1612)
 September 2 – Vincenzo Scamozzi, Italian architect (d. 1616)
 September 7 – Filippo Boncompagni, Italian Catholic cardinal (d. 1586)
 September 29 – William V, Duke of Bavaria (d. 1626)
 October 4 – Matsumae Yoshihiro, Japanese daimyō of Ezochi (Hokkaidō) (d. 1616)
 November 27 – Jacopo Mazzoni, Italian philosopher (d. 1598)
 December 14 – Fernando Ruiz de Castro Andrade y Portugal, Grandee of Spain (d. 1601)
 December 30 – David Pareus, German theologian (d. 1622)
 approx. date – Ma Shouzhen, Chinese courtesan, painter, composer, and poet (d. 1604)
 date unknown
Giordano Bruno, Italian philosopher, astronomer, and occultist (d. 1600)
Oda Nagamasu, Japanese nobleman (d. 1622)
Luis Barahona de Soto, Spanish poet (d. 1595)
William Stanley, English soldier (d. 1630)
Saitō Tatsuoki, Japanese daimyō (d. 1573)
Sidonia von Borcke, German noble and alleged witch (d. 1620)
Tomás Luis de Victoria, Spanish composer (d. 1611)
 probable
Francesco Andreini, Italian actor (d. 1624)
 Francesco Soriano, Italian composer (d. 1621)
 Mariangiola Criscuolo, Italian painter (d. 1630)
Simon Stevin, Flemish mathematician and engineer (d. 1620)

Deaths 

 January 9 – Matthäus Zell, German Lutheran pastor (b. 1477)
 January 23 – Bernardo Pisano, Italian composer (b. 1490)
 February 26 – Lorenzino de' Medici, Italian writer and assassin (b. 1514)
 March 23 – Itagaki Nobukata, Japanese retainer
 March 24 – Gissur Einarsson, first Lutheran bishop in Iceland
 April 1 – King Sigismund I the Old of Poland (b. 1467)
 June 3 – Juan de Zumárraga, Spanish Catholic bishop of Mexico (b. 1468)
 June 6 – João de Castro, Portuguese explorer (b. 1500)
 June 14 – Carpentras, French composer (b. c. 1470)
 July 4 – Philip, Duke of Palatinate-Neuburg, German duke (b. 1503)
 July 29 – Gian Gabriele I of Saluzzo, Italian abbot, Marquess of Saluzzo (b. 1501)
 August 2 – Henry II, Duke of Münsterberg-Oels and Count of Glatz (b. 1507)
 September 5 – Catherine Parr, sixth and last Queen of Henry VIII of England (b. c. 1512)
 September 8 – John III of Pernstein, Bohemian land-owner, Governor of Moravia and Count of Kladsko (b. 1487)
 October 27 – Johannes Dantiscus, Polish poet and Bishop of Warmia (b. 1485)
 November 16 – Caspar Creuziger, German humanist (b. 1504)
 December 27 – Francesco Spiera, Italian Protestant jurist (b. 1502)
 date unknown
 Juan Diego Cuauhtlatoatzin, Mexican Catholic saint (b. 1474)
 Chief Queen Sri Suriyothai, consort of King Maha Chakkrapat of Ayutthaya (killed in battle)
 Strongilah, Jewish Ottoman businesswoman.

References